The Ribald Decameron (also known as Love, Passion and Pleasure) is a 1972 Italian commedia sexy all'italiana film directed by Giuseppe Vari (here credited as Walter Pisani). Nominally based on the Giovanni Boccaccio's novel Decameron, it is part of a series of derivative erotic comedies based on the success of Pier Paolo Pasolini's The Decameron.

Plot summary 
In the Middle Ages, the intrepid Cecco earns eating in taverns and squares as a novelist. His specialty is to re-read the Decameron of Boccaccio, narrating the stories most erotic and licentious, whose theme loves of nuns and friars, and rich women who want to fool theIR old husbands with bold boys.

Cast 

 Dado Crostarosa: Cecco 
 Malisa Longo: Madre Lucrezia 
 Orchidea De Santis: Dinda 
 Giacomo Rizzo: Camillo 
 Patrizia Viotti: Tessa

References

External links

1972 films
Films based on works by Giovanni Boccaccio
Films directed by Giuseppe Vari
1970s sex comedy films
Commedia sexy all'italiana
Films set in the Middle Ages
The Decameron
1972 comedy films
1970s Italian-language films
1970s Italian films